Donaire is a surname. Notable persons with that name include:

Glenn Donaire (born 1979), Filipino-American boxer
Goretti Donaire (born 1982), Spanish footballer
Nonito Donaire (born 1982), Filipino-American boxer, brother of Glenn